The  is a Japanese  Grade 1 flat horse race in Japan for three-year-old thoroughbred colts and fillies run over a distance of 3,000 metres (approximately 1 7/8 miles) at the Kyoto Racecourse, Fushimi-ku, Kyoto, Kyoto Prefecture in October.

It was first run in 1938 and is the Japanese equivalent of the English St. Leger Stakes.

Winners since 1990 

The 2021 and 2022 editions were contested at Hanshin Racecourse, due to construction at Kyoto Racecourse.

Earlier winners 

 1938 - Tetsumon
 1939 - Marutake
 1940 - Tetsuzakura
 1941 - St Lite
 1942 - Hayatake
 1943 - Kurifuji
 1944 - no race
 1945 - no race
 1946 - Azumarai
 1947 - Browny
 1948 - Newford
 1949 - Tosa Midori
 1950 - High Record
 1951 - Track O
 1952 - Saint O
 1953 - Hakuryo
 1954 - Dainana Hoshu
 1955 - Meiji Hikari
 1956 - Kitano O
 1957 - Rhapsody
 1958 - Koma Hikari
 1959 - Hakukurama
 1960 - Kitano Oza
 1961 - Azuma Tenran
 1962 - Hirokimi
 1963 - Great Yoruka
 1964 - Shinzan
 1965 - Dai Koter
 1966 - Nasuno Kotobuki
 1967 - Knit Eight
 1968 - Asaka O
 1969 - Akane Tenryu
 1970 - Date Tenryu
 1971 - Nihon Pollow Moutiers
 1972 - Ishino Hikaru
 1973 - Take Hope
 1974 - Kitano Kachidoki
 1975 - Kokusai Prince
 1976 - Green Grass
 1977 - Press Toko
 1978 - Inter Gushiken
 1979 - Hashi Hermit
 1980 - North Gust
 1981 - Minagawa Manna
 1982 - Horisky
 1983 - Mr. C.B.
 1984 - Symboli Rudolf
 1985 - Miho Shinzan
 1986 - Mejiro Durren
 1987 - Sakura Star O
 1988 - Super Creek
 1989 - Bamboo Begin

See also
 Horse racing in Japan
 List of Japanese flat horse races

References 

Racing Post: 

Horse races in Japan
Turf races in Japan
Flat horse races for three-year-olds